André Monnier (born 26 June 1926) is a French former ski jumper who competed in the early 1950s. He finished tied for 36th in the individual large hill event at the 1952 Winter Olympics in Oslo.

External links
Olympic ski jumping results: 1948-60
André Monnier's profile at Sports Reference.com

1926 births
Living people
French male ski jumpers
Olympic ski jumpers of France
Ski jumpers at the 1952 Winter Olympics
Ski jumpers at the 1956 Winter Olympics